Hibiscadelphus woodii, or "Wood's hau kuahiwi", is a species of flowering plant in the family Malvaceae, endemic to Kauai, Hawaii.

It was discovered in 1991 and described as a new species in 1995. Only four individuals were found at that time; three of those were crushed by a boulder and died between 1995 and 1998, and the last was found dead in 2011. Pollen was found to be inviable, no fruit set was ever observed and all attempts at propagation, including by cross-pollination with H. distans, failed. It was later assessed as extinct by the International Union for Conservation of Nature in 2016, but three individuals were rediscovered in 2019 by the National Tropical Botanical Garden. The plants were growing out of a steep cliff and were found using drones.

Description
Associated plants include kookoolau (Bidens sandvicensis), āhinahina (Artemisia australis), alani (Melicope pallida), naenae (Dubautia spp.), ānaunau (Lepidium serra), nehe (Lipochaeta spp.), kolokolo kuahiwi (Lysimachia glutinosa), Carex meyenii, akoko (Euphorbia spp.), manono (Hedyotis spp.), kuluī (Nototrichium spp.), Panicum lineale, kōlea (Myrsine spp.), Stenogyne campanulata, Lobelia niihauensis, and Mann's Bluegrass (Poa mannii).

References

woodii
Endemic flora of Hawaii
Biota of Kauai
Trees of Hawaii
Plants described in 1995
Taxonomy articles created by Polbot
Critically endangered flora of the United States